Nizhalgal Ravi is an Indian actor who works mainly in Tamil cinema and has performed in Tamil, Malayalam and Telugu films.  He started his career in 1980 with the Tamil film Nizhalgal. He has acted in 500 films.

Films

1970-80s

1990s

2000s

2010s

2020s

Television

Web series

As dubbing artist
In the Tamil speaking community, the program "KBC" got huge reception, due to the dubbing voice performed by Nizhalgal Ravi.
Films

Serials

References

Indian filmographies
Male actor filmographies